Ginneken en Bavel was a municipality in the Dutch province of North Brabant, located southeast of the city of Breda. It covered the villages of Ginneken (now a neighbourhood of Breda) and Bavel.

Ginneken en Bavel existed until 1942, when the village of Ginneken was transferred to Breda, and the other part of the area became a new municipality called Nieuw-Ginneken.

References

Former municipalities of North Brabant
Alphen-Chaam
History of Breda